Coptodisca splendoriferella, the resplendent shield bearer, is a moth of the family Heliozelidae. It was described by James Brackenridge Clemens in 1860. It is found in North America, including California, Ohio and South Carolina.

References

Moths described in 1860
Heliozelidae